Aigbe is a Nigerian given name. Notable people with the name include:

Aigbe Oliha (born 1993), Nigerian footballer
Mercy Aigbe Gentry (born 1978), Nigerian actress, director, and businesswoman

African given names